Woodhouse Grammar School was a secondary school in Woodhouse Road, North Finchley, in the London Borough of Barnet.

The school took in new pupils from 1944 to 1978 at which time the final intake of first years entered and it was called Woodhouse College. There was then a 5 year transition period while the existing school pupils worked their way through year groups, with a gradual increase in lower sixth intake from other schools.

The Building
The first mention of buildings on the site of Woodhouse Grammar School is in 1655, in the probate of the will of Allen Bent of Friern Barnet. The will, dated 15 January 1655, refers to three tenements "called 'The Woodhouses' that are now in the several occupations of William Moore, William Amery and Abraham Wager"...

In 1743 James Patterson, a turner, of the Parish of St George the Martyr in Middlesex came into possession of "all those two messuages called or known as the Woodhouses with one ground room under the said messuages". These two tenements came into the possession of Thomas Collins through his wife on the death of her father James Patterson in 1765; "James Patterson bequeaths his tenements in Finchley to his daughter Henrietta Collins, wife of Thomas Collins" according to the Gentleman’s Magazine 2 November 1827. They had married on 19 November 1761. The third tenement was in the possession of John Bateman, a wine merchant, who in The List of Finchley Freeholders lives at "Woodhouses". In his will, proved in 1776, he orders his executors to sell his house and gardens as soon as possible; and it was sold in 1778 to John Johnson who in 1784 transferred it to Thomas Collins; this is described as "one of the messuages one of the Woodhouses".
Thomas Collins became possessor of all three Woodhouses.

By 1754 at least one of the buildings was called Wood House as seen on John Rocque’s Map of Middlesex. A mansion was built there between 1784 and 1798, becoming the centre of an estate created at the inclosure of Finchley Common. At the inclosure in 1816, the Marquis of Buckingham and Sir William Curtiss, major local landlords, were allocated 45 acres and 39 acres respectively. Thomas Collins bought both their allocations.

A blue plaque commemorating Thomas Collins hangs on a wall outside the present college office (see picture).

On the death of Thomas Collins in 1830, Woodhouse passed to his great niece Margaret Collins Jennings.
There was a marriage settlement between Margaret Collins Jennings of Finchley and William Lambert Esq. of Monmouth which included Wood Houses in Finchley and much other property. They were married on 23 September 1830.  William Lambert was a J.P. for Middlesex. Sometime between 1841 and 1860 the separate house was pulled down.
From the census returns, in 1841 William Lambert (aged 40) and his wife Margaret (aged 35) were living at Wood Houses (one house occupied and 2 uninhabited) – his occupation was given as independent.
The house and estate was then sold to G W Wright-Ingle whose family came from St Ives in Huntingdonshire. Wright-Ingle reconstructed and enlarged the house in 1889 employing the architect E W Robb of St Ives. The down pipes were still marked 1889 when last inspected in 2012. From the plans the lobby and the front and back rooms of the west end of the house were not rebuilt. G W Wright Ingle’s wife had a daughter at Wood House on 27 September 1891 according to the London Standard dated 1 October 1891.

In 1910 the house came into the possession of the Busvine family according to Percy Reboul (1994).
Middlesex County Council agreed to buy the house in 1915 but only "when peace was restored" which unfortunately meant that the building suffered some neglect before becoming a school in 1922.

The School
The school was opened as The Woodhouse School in 1922 by Middlesex County Council, becoming Woodhouse Grammar School following the 1944 Education Act. It remained as a fully state-funded grammar school until it closed in 1978 and re-opened as a state sixth form college (Woodhouse College).

The change was triggered by the introduction of the 1976 Education Act, which effectively killed off grammar schools in favour of non-selective comprehensives. The then Conservative Member of Parliament for Finchley, Margaret Thatcher, (later to become Prime Minister and The Right Honourable The Baroness Thatcher) was Education Secretary in the Conservative government from 1970 to 1974 and a vocal supporter of grammar schools during a time of rising support for a change to non-selection at age 11.
However, when the Labour government was elected in 1974 and passed the 1976 Education Act, the writing was on the wall for Woodhouse.

As the newly-elected Leader of Her Majesty's Opposition, Mrs Thatcher continued to oppose the move to comprehensives and rejected plans for Woodhouse to merge with the local secondary modern school to create the "Friern Barnet & Woodhouse Comprehensive School". Her opposition ensured that the school retained its selective status, albeit as a sixth-form college.

Motto and Houses

The School Motto was "Cheerfulness with Industry", conjuring up an image of pupils working hard but smiling through. Very much a motif of the post-war era and indeed of England itself.
The old school coat of arms, displaying this motto, is still displayed above the stage in the college hall (as at 2014).
The names of the forty-seven former pupils who died during the Second World War are recorded in a hand illuminated Roll of Honour which hangs at the foot of the main staircase near the front entrance to the existing college.
The Roll of Honour also records the names of the four houses of the old grammar school

There were four School Houses, each with a designated colour - Gordon (yellow), Livingstone (green), Nightingale (blue) and Scott (red), remembering the historical British hero-figures of General Gordon. David Livingstone, Florence Nightingale and Robert Falcon Scott.
The school tie was patterned with two yellow vertical stripes, with a middle stripe in the wearer's house colour. So if you were in Gordon house you had three yellow stripes.
The original School Song celebrates the motto and the four houses:

"By field and track, by pitch and court,
Hygiea beckons active youth,
A welcome call, a bracing call,
For graceful poise and strength of frame,
And nature nods approving smile,
On gallant struggles lost and won.

By board and chart, by bench and book,
Minerva sagely summons youth,
Impelling call, imperious call,
For mental poise and strength of will,
And Muses calm sweet solace give,
To those who strive for truth and right.

In daily round and common task,
Our aim to take a cheerful part;
To those in need an out-stretched hand;
And when there comes the last great call,
For some may be the scroll of fame,
For all "Well done, you played the game"."

The chorus was:

"Gordon, Livingstone, Nightingale and Scott,
Cheerfulness with industry,
Woodhouse!"

Prefects wore an enamel badge, depicting the school crest as shown in the photos alongside.

The Dennis Whitaker years – 1969 to 1982
Under the leadership of Mr Dennis Whitaker (1918–2011) the Headmaster from 1969 to 1982, Woodhouse Grammar School flourished and became one of the best-performing schools in the country.

Despite leaving school at 14 with no qualifications, Mr Whitaker devoted much of his life to ensuring future generations received a high-quality education.
While head of Woodhouse, he oversaw its transition from a Grammar School to a sixth-form college.

"It was his mission to make sure that the students went away feeling as good as any pupil at the grammar school," said his daughter, Louise, who is a teacher for deaf pupils at Hendon School in Golders Rise.

Whitaker was a strong advocate of school uniforms, to create a sense of equality, and was also one of the first to call for equal pay for women teachers.

Like the author, most pupils of his will remember Mr Whitaker as a strict and formal figure, who swept into morning assembly wearing his black gown causing pupils and teachers alike to shoot to their feet in utter terror.
The author recalls that in the early 1970s his dreaded "hair inspections" were the most-feared event of the week. God help any boy whose hair was less than one inch above the collar or covered his ears!
However, he relaxed and showed humour as times, notably when he once took an assembly wearing the scarf of his beloved Burnley Football Club.

Arthur King
The Headmaster previous to Mr Whitaker was Mr Arthur King.

Notable alumni
 Cyril Fletcher, comedian famous for his "odd odes"
 David Hirsh, sociologist
 Giles Hart, British engineer and trade union activist
 Ian Bedford, cricketer 
 John Somerville, sculptor
 Oliver Postgate, English animator and creator of Bagpuss 
 Paul Davies, astrophysicist
 Robert G. W. Anderson, Director of the British Museum

Gallery

References

Defunct grammar schools in England
Defunct schools in the London Borough of Barnet